The 1942 U.S. National Championships (now known as the US Open) was a tennis tournament that took place on the outdoor grass courts at the West Side Tennis Club, Forest Hills in New York City, United States. The tournament ran from 27 August until 7 September. It was the 62nd staging of the U.S. National Championships and due to World War II it was the only Grand Slam tennis event of the year.

Finals

Men's singles

 Ted Schroeder defeated  Frank Parker  8–6, 7–5, 3–6, 4–6, 6–2

Women's singles

 Pauline Betz defeated  Louise Brough  4–6, 6–1, 6–4

Men's doubles
 Gardnar Mulloy /  Bill Talbert defeated  Ted Schroeder /  Sidney Wood 9–7, 7–5, 6–1

Women's doubles
 Louise Brough /  Margaret Osborne defeated  Pauline Betz /  Doris Hart 2–6, 7–5, 6–0

Mixed doubles
 Louise Brough /   Ted Schroeder defeated  Patricia Todd /  Alejo Russell 3–6, 6–1, 6–4

References

External links
Official US Open website

 
U.S. National Championships
U.S. National Championships (tennis) by year
U.S. National Championships
U.S. National Championships
U.S. National Championships
U.S. National Championships